La sonnambula (The Sleepwalker) is an opera semiseria in two acts, with music in the bel canto tradition by Vincenzo Bellini set to an Italian libretto by Felice Romani, based on a scenario for a ballet-pantomime written by Eugène Scribe and choreographed by Jean-Pierre Aumer called La somnambule, ou L'arrivée d'un nouveau seigneur. The ballet had premiered in Paris in September 1827 at the height of a fashion for stage works incorporating somnambulism.

The role of Amina was originally written for the soprano sfogato Giuditta Pasta and the tenor Giovanni Battista Rubini, but during Bellini's lifetime another soprano sfogato, Maria Malibran, was a notable exponent of the role. The first performance took place at the Teatro Carcano in Milan on 6 March 1831.

The majority of twentieth-century recordings have been made with a soprano cast as Amina, usually with added top-notes and other changes according to tradition, although it was released in soprano sfogato voice (not be confused with the modern mezzo, nonexistent at the time) who sang soprano and contralto roles unmodified.

The phrase  ("I did not believe you would fade so soon, oh flower") from Amina's final aria is inscribed on Bellini's tomb in the Catania Cathedral in Sicily.

Composition history 

Returning to Milan after the I Capuleti e i Montecchi performances in March 1830, little occurred until the latter part of April when Bellini was able to negotiate a contracts with both the Milan house for the autumn of 1831 and another for the 1832 Carnival season at La Fenice in Venice; these operas were to become Norma for La Scala and Beatrice di Tenda for Venice. Writing to his uncle in Sicily, the composer reported that "I shall earn almost twice as much as if I had composed [only for the Venetian impresario]".

However, there was also a contract for a second Milan house for the following winter season for as-yet an unnamed opera, but it had already been agreed that Giuditta Pasta, who had achieved success in Milan in 1829 and 1830 appearing in several major operas, would be the principal artist.

Then Bellini experienced the re-occurrence of an illness which had emerged in Venice due to pressure of work and the bad weather, and which consistently recurred after each opera. The gastro-enteric condition—which he described as "a tremendous inflammatory gastric bilious fever"— resulted in his being cared for by friends. It was not until the summer, when he went to stay near Lake Como, that the pressure to decide upon a subject for the following winter's opera became more urgent. That Pasta owned a house near Como and would be staying there over the summer was the reason that Felice Romani traveled to meet both her and Bellini.

By 15 July they had decided on a subject for early 1831, but it was uncertain as to whether Pasta was interested in singing a trousers role, that of the protagonist, Ernani, in an adaptation of Victor Hugo's Hernani, later set to music by Giuseppe Verdi in 1844. With both men having various other commitments, by the end of November 1830 nothing had been achieved in the way of writing either the libretto or the score of Ernani but, by January, the situation and the subject had changed. Bellini wrote that "[Romani] is now writing ...It must go on stage on 20 February at the latest."

That music which he was beginning to use for Ernani was transferred to Sonnambula is not in doubt, and, as Weinstock comments, "he was as ready as most other composers of his era to reuse in a new situation musical passages created for a different, earlier one".

During Bellini's lifetime another , Maria Malibran, was to become a notable exponent of the role of Amina.

Performance history

19th century 

With its pastoral setting and story, La sonnambula was an immediate success and is still regularly performed. The title role of Amina (the sleepwalker) with its high tessitura is renowned for its difficulty, requiring a complete command of trills and florid technique, but it fitted Pasta's vocal capabilities, her soprano also having been described as a soprano sfogato, one which designates a contralto who is capable—by sheer industry or natural talent—of extending her upper range and being able to encompass the coloratura soprano tessitura.

The opera's premiere performance took place on 6 March 1831, a little later than the original date. Its success was partly due to the differences between Romani's earlier libretti and this one, as well as "the accumulation of operatic experience which both [Bellini] and Romani had brought to its creation." Press reactions were universally positive, as was that of the Russian composer, Mikhail Glinka, who attended and wrote overwhelmingly enthusiastically:
Pasta and Rubini sang with the most evident enthusiasm to support their favourite conductor [sic]; the second act the singers themselves wept and carried the audience along with them.

After its premiere, the opera was performed in London on 28 July 1831 at the King’s Theatre and in New York on 13 November 1835 at the Park Theatre. Herbert Weinstock provides a comprehensive year-by-year listing of performances following the premiere and then, with some gaps, all the way up to 1900.

Later, it was a vehicle for showcasing Jenny Lind, Emma Albani and—in the early 20th century—for Lina Pagliughi and Toti Dal Monte.

20th and 21st centuries 

Weinstock's account of performances given charts those in the 20th century beginning from 1905. Stagings were presented as frequently as every two years in one European or North American venue or another, and they continued through the 1950s bel canto revivals up to the publication of his book in 1971. The opera was rescued from the ornamental excesses and misrepresentations more similar to the baroque style than the bel canto of Bellini when it was sung by Maria Callas in the now-famous 1955 production by Luchino Visconti at La Scala.

Contributing to the revivals were Joan Sutherland's taking the role of Amina at Covent Garden in 1961 and at the Metropolitan Opera in 1963, where the role become one of her most significant successes.

While not part of the standard repertory, La sonnambula is performed reasonably frequently in the 21st century. It has been given three productions with Natalie Dessay, the first at the Santa Fe Opera in 2004, the second in Paris in January/February 2010, and the third at the Metropolitan Opera in 2009, a production which was revived in Spring 2014 with Diana Damrau singing the role of Amina. A production was mounted by The Royal Opera in London in 2011, by the Salzburger Landestheater in Salzburg 2015, and by the Staatstheater am Gärtnerplatz in Munich in 2015/2016. The first mezzo-soprano to record the role was Frederica von Stade in 1980, followed by Cecilia Bartoli.

Roles

Synopsis 
Place: Switzerland
Time: Indeterminate

Act 1 
Scene 1: A village, a mill in the background

As the betrothal procession of Amina and Elvino approaches, the villagers all proclaiming joy for Amina, Lisa, the proprietress of the inn, comes outside expressing her misery:  / "All is joy and merriment... I alone am miserable". She is consumed with jealousy for she had once been betrothed to Elvino and had been abandoned by him in favour of Amina. The lovelorn Alessio arrives, but she rejects his advances. All assembled proclaim the beauty of Amina:  / "In Switzerland there is no flower sweeter, dearer than Amina". Then Amina comes out of the mill with her  adoptive mother, Teresa, the mill owner. Amina thanks her, also expressing her thanks to her assembled friends for their kind wishes. (Aria:  / "How brightly this day dawned for me".) Additionally, she thanks Alessio, who tells her that he has composed the wedding song and organised the celebrations; she wishes him well in his courtship of Lisa, but Lisa cynically rejects the idea of love. Elvino arrives, exclaiming  / "Forgive me my beloved", and explaining that he had to stop on his way at his mother's grave to ask her blessing on Amina. As they exchange vows, the notary asks what she brings to the partnership: "Only my heart" she answers at which Elvino's exclaims: "Ah the heart is everything!". (Elvino's aria, then Amina, then all express their love and their joy:  / "Here, receive this ring that the beloved spirit who smiled upon our love wore at the altar".)

The sound of horses' hooves and a cracking whip is heard. A stranger arrives, asking the way to the castle. Lisa points out that it is getting late and he will not reach it before dark and she offers him lodging at her inn. When he says that he knows the inn, all are surprised. (Rodolfo's aria:  / "O lovely scenes, again I see you, / where in serenity I spent the calm and happy days of my earliest youth".) The newcomer, who surprises the villagers by his familiarity with the locality, asks about the celebrations and admires Amina, who reminds him of a girl he had loved long ago. ( / "You can't know how those dear eyes gently touch my heart, what adorable beauty".) He admits to having once stayed in the castle, whose lord has been dead for four years. When Teresa explains that his son had vanished some years previously, the stranger assures them that he is alive and will return. As darkness approaches the villagers warn him that it is time to be indoors to avoid the village phantom:  / "When the sky is dark at night, and the moon's rays are weak, at the gloomy thunder's sound [....] a shade appears." Not being superstitious, he assures them that they will soon be free of the apparition. Elvino is jealous of the stranger's admiration of Amina; he is jealous even of the breezes that caress her, but he promises her he will reform. (Duet finale, Elvino and Amina:  / "I envy the wandering breeze that plays with your hair, your veil..")

Scene 2: A room in the inn

Lisa enters Rodolfo's room to see if all is well. She reveals that his identity is known to all as Rodolfo, the long-lost son of the count. She advises him that the village is preparing a formal welcome; meanwhile she wishes to be the first to pay her respects. She is flattered when he begins a flirtation with her, but runs out at the sound of people approaching, dropping her handkerchief which the Count picks up. He sees the approaching phantom whom he recognises as Amina. She enters the room, walking in her sleep, all the while calling for Elvino and asking where he is. Realising that her nocturnal wanderings have given rise to the story of the village phantom, Rodolfo is about to take advantage of her helpless state. But then he is struck by her obvious innocence and refrains: (Scene: first Rodolfo:  / "God! What am I doing?"; then, separately, Amina:  / "How happy all the people are, accompanying us to the church"; then together.) Amina continues her sleepwalk and falls asleep on the sofa, but Rodolfo hears the sound of people approaching and, with no other way out, he climbs out of the window.

Amina continues to sleep on the sofa as the villagers arrive at the inn. Lisa enters and points to Amina, who wakes up at the noise. Elvino, believing her faithless, rejects Amina in fury. Only Teresa, her adoptive mother, believes in her innocence: Ensemble finale, first Amina  / "In my thought or in my words never , never have I sinned"; then Elvino:  / "Heaven keep you from feeling ever the pain that I feel now!"; then the people and Teresa, the former proclaiming her treachery, Teresa pleading for her to be allowed to explain. Elvino then exclaims that there will be no wedding, and each expresses his or her emotional reaction to this discovery.

Act 2 
Scene 1: A wood

On their way to ask the count to attest to Amina's innocence, the villagers rest in the woods and consider how they will express their support to him: (Chorus:  / "Here the wood is thick and dark"). Amina and Teresa arrive and are on a similar mission, but Amina is despondent, although Teresa encourages her daughter to continue. They then see Elvino coming in the wood looking downcast and sad. He continues to reject Amina, even when the townspeople come in with the news that the count says that she is innocent. Elvino is not convinced and takes back the ring, though he is unable to tear her image from his heart: (Aria, then chorus:  / "Why cannot I despise you, faithless, as I should?")

Scene 2: The village, as in act 1

Lisa, Alessio, Elvino and the villagers are in the square. Elvino declares that he will renew his vows and proceed to marry Lisa. She is delighted. As they are about to go to the church, Rodolfo enters and tries to explain that Amina is innocent because she did not come to his room awake – she is a somnambulist, a sleepwalker: (Duet, first Elvino  / "I cannot deny, my lord, what my eyes have seen"; then Rodolfo  / "Certain people when they sleep go about as if awake".) Elvino refuses to believe him and calls upon Lisa to leave, but at that moment Teresa begs the villagers to be quiet, because Amina has at last fallen into an exhausted sleep.

Learning of the impending marriage, Teresa confronts Lisa, who says that she has never been found alone in a man's room. Teresa produces the handkerchief Lisa had accidentally dropped in the Count's room. The Count is unwilling to say what he thinks of this, but continues to insist on Amina's virtue. Elvino demands proof and Rodolfo, seeing the sleeping Amina walking across the high, dangerously unstable mill bridge, warns that to wake her would be fatal. All watch as she relives her betrothal and her grief at Elvino's rejection, taking the withered flowers in her hand. (Aria: Amina  / "I had not thought I would see you, dear flowers, perished so soon".) Then as she reaches the other side safely, the distraught Elvino calls to her and she is taken into his arms. Rodolfo hands him the ring which he places on her finger, at which time she awakens and is amazed by what has happened. All rejoice. In an aria finale, Amina expresses her joy:  / "Human thought cannot conceive of the happiness that fills me".

Recordings

Audio

Video

References 
Notes

Cited sources

Further reading
Anderson, James (1999), The Complete Dictionary of Opera and Operetta. Wings Books. 
Budden, Julian; Forbes, Elizabeth; Maguire, Simon (1998), "La sonnambula", in Stanley Sadie, (ed.), The New Grove Dictionary of Opera, vol. 4. London: Macmillan Publishers, Inc.  
Casa Ricordi (pub.), "Vincenzo Bellini": Outline of his life (in English) and list of critical editions of his works published by Ricordi on ricordi.it. Retrieved 13 December 2013.
Galatopoulos, Stelios (2002),  Bellini: Life, Times, Music: 1801–1835. London, Sanctuary Publishing. 
Osborne, Charles (1994), The Bel Canto Operas of Rossini, Donizetti, and Bellini, Portland, Oregon: Amadeus Press. 
Orrey, Leslie (1973), Bellini (The Master Musicians Series), London: J. M. Dent. 
Rosselli, John (1996), The Life of Bellini, New York: Cambridge University Press. 
Rutherford, Susan (2007), "La cantante delle passioni: Giuditta Pasta and the Idea of Operatic Performance", Cambridge Opera Journal, Vol. 19, No. 2, July 
Thiellay, Jean; Thiellay, Jean-Philippe (2013), Bellini, Paris: Actes Sud.  
Willier, Stephen Ace (2002), Vincenzo Bellini: A Guide to Research. Routledge.

External links 

Libretto (Italian), Opera Glass, Stanford University
Cast, synopsis (Italian, English, German), libretto (Italian, German), Opera Guide
La sonnambula, containing the Italian text, with an English translation, and the music of all the principal airs, O. Ditson, Boston, 1900, archive.org
Libretto in Italian and English, Testament Records (UK)
Shelton, Francis, "Bellini: La sonnambula" (review of Cecilia Bartoli's performance in the title role, Festspielhaus Baden-Baden, 10 April 2008), Musical Criticism.
Synopsis of La sonnambula, Metropolitan Opera

Operas by Vincenzo Bellini
Italian-language operas
Opera semiseria
Operas based on plays
Operas based on works by Eugène Scribe
1831 operas
Operas
Works about wedding
Libretti by Felice Romani